tRNA modification GTPase GTPBP3, mitochondrial is an enzyme that in human is encoded by the GTPBP3 gene on chromosome 19.

The GTPBP3 gene encodes a GTP-binding protein that is evolutionarily conserved from bacteria to mammals  and which is localized to the mitochondrion and functions in tRNA modification. At least two major isoforms due to alternative splicing are known In addition, a polymorphism on valine 250 is known and may influence aminoglydoside-induced deafness.

Structure 

The GTPBP3 gene contains 10 exons, and encodes a ~44 kDa GTP-binding protein that is evolutionarily conserved from bacteria to mammals. The N-terminal domain of mitochondrial tRNA modification GTPase mediates the dimerization of the protein in a potassium-independent manner, which is thought to be related to the construction of the binding site for the one-carbon-unit donor in its tRNA modification reaction function.

Function 

Mitochondrial tRNA modification GTPase is thought to catalyze the formation of 5-taurinomethyluridine (τm(5)U) in the anticodon wobble position of five mitochondrial tRNA. The gene was first discovered yeast where the mutation of the yeast homolog of human GTPBP3, MSS1, is found to elicit respiratory defect in yeast only when the mitochondrial 155 rRNA P(R)454 is present. The latter is equivalent to the human 12 rRNA A1555G mutation which has been found to associate with deafness. Hence GTPBP3 and its yeast homolog function in modification of mitochondrial function. In human, GTPBP3 is ubiquitously expressed in multiple tissues in multiple transcripts.  As a tRNA modification enzyme, it is thought to function to modify codon-anticodon interaction, which is consistent with its modification of the severity of phenotypes in 12S rRNA A1555G mutation..

Clinical Significance 

Mutations in GTPBP3 are known to cause hypertrophic cardiomyopathy and mitochondrial defects. Individuals with homozygous or compound heterozygous mutations in GTPBP3 present with combined deficiency of respiratory chain complexes in skeletal muscle, which require mitochondrial translation of mitochondrial-encoded complex subunits to assemble. GTPBP3 mutations cause severe mitochondrial translation defect. The majority of characterized subjects presented with lactic acidosis and hypertrophic cardiomyopathy.

The valine 250 polymorphisms on GTPBP3 is associated with severity of aminoglycoside-induced deafness in human, a disease associated with homoplasmic A1555G mutation in the mitochondrial-encoded 12S rRNA and is characterized by deafness, varying from profond congenital hearing loss to normal hearing.

References

Further reading 

 
 
 
 
 

Enzymes